Yongchuan is a district of Chongqing, China, located by the north side of upper reach of Yangtze River, with a history of 1200 years.

Administration
Yongchuan District administers 19 townships and 3 subdistricts.

History
Yongchuan enjoys a history of 1200 years.
In 776, Yongchuan county was established.
In 1983, Yongchuan county was put under the administration of Chongqing city.
In 1992, Yongchuan county was promoted to a city level, called Yongchuan city.
In 2006, Yongchuan city was changed into Yongchuan district, a county-level division of Chongqing.

Geographic condition
Yongchuan is in west Chongqing, in border with Bishan and Jiangjin in east, with Dazu and Rongchang in west, with Tongliang in north, and with Luxiang and Hejiang. Yongchuan is located in 05°37′31″－106°5′7″ of longitude and 28°56′16″－29°34′30″ of north latitude.

Climate
The climate of Yongchuan belongs to subtropic monsoon weather style, with an annual average temperature of 17.7℃, monthly average temperature of 7.2℃ in January, 27.3℃ in July, total annual radiation of 1273.6 hrs, total annual rainfall of 1015 mm, frost-free period of 317 days .

Transportation
The Yangtze river passes through Jiangjin, making up a 17.6 [km] long waterway. Both the Chengdu-Chongqing freeway and Chengdu-Chongqing railway have their ways across Yongchuan, which make up a very convenient traffic condition.

Economy
Yongchuan is one of important agricultural production areas in China, with a products include of rice, wheat, sweet potato, tea, vegetables, fruits, silk and bamboo. Its animal husbandry include pig raising etc.
In 2006, its total annual GDP was CNY12.194 billion.

Tourism
The famous tourism place in Yongchuan is the Tea Mountain and Bamboo Sea.

References

External links
Official website

Districts of Chongqing